Raegan Albarnas is a professional association football player who plays for Chennai City F.C. and for Tamil Nadu in the national level.

Early career
Raegan began his career with representing Tamil Nadu football team in Santosh Trophy. In 2016 Santosh Trophy, he scored 3 goals and helped his team reach the semi finals.

Club career

Chennai City
In January 2017, Raegan was signed by I-League debutants, Chennai City F.C. Raegan made his professional debut against Mohun Bagan A.C. on 21 January 2017 when he was substituted in on 80th minute.
He was later released by the club, by mutual consent. He joined AGORC FC in the Chennai Super Division Football League.

International career
Raegan was selected in the squad for 2008 AFC U-16 Championship to represent India national under-16 football team.

References

1989 births
Living people
Indian footballers
India youth international footballers
Association football forwards
I-League players
Chennai City FC players
Footballers from Tamil Nadu